József Molnár (21 March 1821 – 6 March 1899) was a Hungarian painter.

Molnár was born in Zsámbék and studied in Venice, Rome and Munich.  After his studies, he settled down in Stuttgart, where he earned money by painting portraits. He returned to Hungary in 1853 and started painting landscapes and historic paintings in Pest.

Molnár died in Budapest.

Gallery

References 

MOLNÁR, József

1821 births
1899 deaths
Hungarian romantic painters
Hungarian illustrators
Landscape painters
People from Zsámbék
19th-century Hungarian painters
Hungarian male painters
Romantic painters
19th-century Hungarian male artists